Lars-Olof Mikael Jansson (born 4 September 1965) is a Swedish politician who was Leader of the Sweden Democrats (SD) from 1995 to 2005. He served as defence spokesman for the Sweden Democrats in the Riksdag from 2010 to 2018. Jansson is currently the Deputy Chairman of Alternative for Sweden.

Political career 

In 1990, Jansson joined the Centre Party and was for a time the second vice-president in Örebro's Centre Party's county organization and substitute member for the Centre Party in Vasa municipal board in Örebro. In 1993 he switched to the Sweden Democrats, where he in 1994 he was elected second vice president, and in 1995 the new party chairman at the party congress in Norrköping. He served as chairman for 10 years. In May 2005 Jimmie Åkesson took over as chairman. The same year, he released the book I eget spår genom obruten terräng about his time as party leader.

He served as head of the local party district in Gothenburg from 1995-2014 and in the 2006 elections he was elected to the City Council in Gothenburg and also set up as a third candidate to the European Parliament in 2009 on the party's behalf.

Mikael Jansson was the Sweden Democrats' candidate for the post of Second Deputy Speaker of the Riksdag in 2010, but was not elected. Since 2010, he has been a member of parliament, a member of the defence committee, and a spokesperson for the party. During  the years 2012–2014, Jansson was a member of the defence commission, which examines future defence policy.

Mikael Jansson is also one of twelve members in the Swedish Export Control Council (ECC), a parliamentary appointed group that advise the Inspectorate of Strategic Products (ISP) on how to deal with war material export issues. The Sweden Democrats party have one seat in total in the council.

On 1 February 2017 the Swedish government decided to start a new defence commission that will be finished in May 2019. Jansson was appointed representative for the Sweden Democrats party.

On 9 April 2018 he defected to the SD breakaway Alternative for Sweden.

Controversies 

In the fall of 2016 before the US election, Jansson chose to publicly go out in the Swedish media by writing an article in one of Sweden's largest newspaper Expressen saying "Should the United States maintain its superpower status it will require that someone will take a series of difficult decisions " and attacking President Obama's foreign policy, saying "American foreign policy, both have been cynical, cruel and has failed.". Mikael Jansson had not cleared the article within his party and did not have the party's support.

The Sweden Democrats party leader Jimmie Åkesson, as well as all other 348 members of parliament from all parties, declared most of them either supported Hillary Clinton or did not want to choose. Jansson was invited to several TV and radio interviews where he chose to defend his earlier statement that "Donald Trump was the best choice not only for the USA but for Europe and Sweden as well". Several Swedish media called it shocking and Sweden's Minister for Justice and Migration Morgan Johansson from the Social Democrats party said on Twitter "Mikael Jansson (SD) supports Trump. Not surprisingly. Haters holding together."

References

Bibliography 

 I eget spår genom obruten terräng (2005).

1965 births
Living people
People from Umeå
People from Gothenburg
Leaders of political parties in Sweden
Members of the Riksdag from the Sweden Democrats
Alternative for Sweden politicians
Right-wing populism in Sweden
21st-century Swedish politicians